Akhalgori Municipality or Leningor District is a municipality in Georgia or South Ossetia respectively. Georgia considers Akhalgori part of the Mtskheta-Mtianeti. According to Tskhinval, the current Head of Administration of Leningor is Alan Djussoev, and the current Deputy Head is Alexander Baratashvili. Before the 2008 war, the municipality was divided, with the eastern part under Georgian and the western under South Ossetian control

The Georgian controlled part of Akhalgori/Leningor Municipality had a population of 7,700 in 2002, with approximately 2,000 living in the town itself. The largest villages were Ikorta, Korinta, Qanchaveti, Kvemo Zakhori, Largvisi, Doretkari, and Karchokhi. The population was primarily Georgian (6,520) and Ossetian (1,110) prior to the 2008 Russo-Georgian War. Since the war, over 5,000 ethnic Georgians –
at least 70% of the total population and 90% of local ethnic Georgians – have fled the area, citing discrimination and a "climate of fear" under the Russian-South Ossetian control. Unlike in other Georgian enclaves, Ossetian militias have not systematically destroyed village structures, though there have been some reports of attacks against civilians and complaints of intimidation.

International status
According to administrative divisions of South Ossetia the municipality is located on territory of Leningor District.

Sites
The district houses several notable pieces of medieval Georgian architecture, listed below:
 
Ikorta church
 Ikoti nunnery and church (1172)
The monasteries of Kabeni, Largvisi, and Khopa (9th-13th century)
The basilicas of Lomisi, Armazi, and Bikari;
The fortresses of Tsirkoli and Tskhmori.
The old palace of the Eristavi noble Family

See also
 Mtskheta-Mtianeti

Notes

References

External links 

 
Districts of Georgia (country)
Populated places in Mtskheta-Mtianeti
Districts of South Ossetia